Arch Creek is a stream in Carbon County, Montana, in the United States.

Arch Creek was named from a nearby natural arch.

See also
List of rivers of Montana

References

Rivers of Carbon County, Montana
Rivers of Montana